The First Legislative Assembly of Delhi was constituted in Nov 1993 after the Council of Minister was replaced by the Delhi Legislative Assembly through the Constitution Act 1991 and by the Government of National Capital Territory of Delhi Act, 1991 the Sixty-ninth Amendment to the Indian constitution. The amendment declared the Union Territory of Delhi to be formally known as National Capital Territory of Delhi, subsequently Delhi holding the 1st state elections.

Total six national parties, three state parties, forty-one registered (unrecognised) parties and other independent candidates contested for 70 assembly seats. With 49 seats, BJP got the majority and formed government.

Electors

Candidates

Important members

List of members
Default sort, in ascending order of constituency

References 

Indian politics articles by importance
Delhi Legislative Assembly